It's Tough to Be a Bug! is a 9-minute-long 3D film based on the 1998 Disney·Pixar film A Bug's Life, using theater lighting, 3-D filming techniques, audio-animatronics and various special effects. Flik, a character from the movie, hosts the show and educates the audience on why bugs should be considered friends. It was the first Pixar attraction to open in a Disney park.

The attraction opened in Disney's Animal Kingdom at the Walt Disney World Resort on April 22, 1998, a full seven months before the actual feature debuted in theaters, and is housed within the theme park's icon, the Tree of Life. A second version of the attraction debuted at the opening of Disney California Adventure on February 8, 2001. The version at California Adventure closed permanently on March 19, 2018, and was replaced by Web Slingers: A Spider-Man Adventure, an interactive screen ride based on the Spider-Man films set in the Marvel Cinematic Universe.

At Disney California Adventure, the Bug's Life Theater was located in A Bug's Land. There, the queue passed through a replica of Ant Island before heading underground, where the queue appeared the same as the one at Disney's Animal Kingdom. It was originally part of the Bountiful Valley Farm area of the park until A Bug's Land was built around it.

Production
About a year before the opening of Animal Kingdom, Disney Imagineers had decided to place a show inside the park's centerpiece Tree of Life, but struggled to find an acceptable concept. Disney CEO Michael Eisner suggested a tie-in with the upcoming Pixar film A Bug's Life, and the creative team developed a story based around the characters from the film. Visual effects studio Rhythm and Hues was brought in to produce the 3-D animated portion of the show, while Disney special effects teams created the rest of the experience, including animatronic characters, wind, water, and foul smells.

Summary

Queue
At Disney's Animal Kingdom, the Tree of Life theater is located inside the Tree of Life. As the queue winds around the tree, visitors can glimpse animal carvings on the tree that aren't visible from other vantage points. The "underground" lobby area features posters of various bug acts from the show, as well as those for all-insect parodies of Broadway musicals, such as Beauty and the Bees, Web Side Story, Little Shop of Hoppers and My Fair Ladybug. The lobby music overture consists of insect renditions of Broadway musical numbers.

Attraction
After the theater doors close, an announcer advises the audience not to buzz, sting, pollinate or chirp during the show. Flik the ant, in audio-animatronic form, emerges from a hole in the theater's ceiling and welcomes the audience and tells them to put on their bug eyes (3D glasses). The show begins with butterflies, in formation as curtains, flying away. Flik now appears on screen to present the acts of the show after the title card is presented. Jungle music begins to play, and a Mexican red knee tarantula (referred to as a Chilean rose tarantula in the show) named Chili makes his appearance. A pair of acorn weevils, along with Weevil Kneevil, place a slingshot on the stage and launch acorns from it (triggering hidden air cannons). Chili shoots the first acorn with a quill but fails to shoot the second due to Weevil holding on to it, then taunts Chili who chases after him. Flik presents the second act as a "soldier termite who defends his mound by spraying intruders with acid". A piece of the set falls with a rumble and the "Termite-nator" steps out, then shoots at a taunting flea, then the audience, sensing more intruders (which triggers hidden water sprayers), despite Flik's protests, until he runs out of acid and leaves, saying that he will be back. Flik reappears and hopes the audience isn’t allergic to acid.  The next act Flik introduces is a stinkbug named Claire de Room, who walks onto the stage. The acorn weevils place a flower as a target, Weevil re-enters the scene and crashes into the flower, causing it to move towards the audience. Claire then passes gas, which affects and disgusts both Weevil and the audience (which triggers hidden smell cannons in the theater).

An explosion is heard as Hopper the grasshopper, in audio-animatronic form, appears. He orders a stag beetle chase Flik off the stage and four wasps hold up an advertisement flyer for "Knock 'em Dead" exterminators. The wasps turn over the ad and uses it as a makeshift movie screen to show movie clips from old monster movies featuring giant bugs (Earth vs. the Spider, Beginning of the End and Empire of the Ants). Hopper wants to make humans experience the same "medicine" and a giant fly swatter attempts to flatten the audience. After Hopper discovers the audience is still alive, he declares war on them. The screen goes black as a hand appears with a can of bug spray and sprays it at the guest (which triggers a hidden fog machine above the screen). Hornets sting the audience (which triggers a small piece of rubber tubing that pokes each guest's back) and several black widow spiders go up and down, trying to capture and scare the audience. Hopper, now on screen, boasts nothing can stop him, but a chameleon appears and tries to eat him, making Hopper flee.

Flik reappears and says that he forgot to mention the reptiles, which segues into the finale. Bees, dung beetles (The Dung Brothers), dragonflies and other bugs sing about how insects help humans and about how "it's tough to be a bug". Weevil returns, holding a moldy cupcake and the bugs chase him. The butterflies come back to form a curtain and Flik reappears in audio-animatronic form from the ceiling, to wrap the show. After the theater is lit up again, the announcer requests the guests to remain seated so the beetles, maggots, and cockroaches may exit safely. The bugs start to talk all at once as they exit (which triggers hidden rubber wheels to roll at the bottom of the seats). The announcer then tells the audience to gather up their personal belongings and take their "small grubs" by their "grubby little hands" as they exit.

Cast
The cast includes:
Dave Foley as Flik, an ant.
Andrew Stanton as Hopper, a grasshopper.(Stanton reprises the voice doubling for Kevin Spacey, who originally voiced the character in A Bug's Life)
Cheech Marin as Chili, a Mexican redknee tarantula.
French Stewart as The Termite-ator, a termite.
Tom Kenny as The Dung Beetle Brothers, two dung beetles.
Jason Alexander as Weevil Kneevil, an acorn weevil.

Music
The attraction's titular theme song was written by George Wilkins and Kevin Rafferty and is included in the disc "Theme Park Classics" of the Disney Classics compilation box set. The show's score was composed and conducted by Bruce Broughton, while much of the queue music was arranged by Wilkins. The queue features parodies or renditions of songs from famous Broadway shows using bug sounds.

"One" (A Cockroach Line), a parody of "One" (A Chorus Line)
"Beauty and the Bees" (Beauty and the Bees), a parody of "Beauty and the Beast" (Beauty and the Beast)
"Tomorrow" (Antie), a parody of "Tomorrow" (Annie)
"I Feel Pretty" (Web Side Story) a parody of "I Feel Pretty" (West Side Story)
"Hello Dung Lovers" (The Dung and I), a parody of "Hello Young Lovers" (The King and I)
"Tonight" (Web Side Story), a parody of "Tonight" (West Side Story) mixed with Flight of the Bumblebee

See also
The Tree of Life
Muppet*Vision 3D – A similar attraction at Disney's Hollywood Studios
Mickey's PhilharMagic
List of Disney's Animal Kingdom attractions
List of former Disney California Adventure attractions
2018 in amusement parks

References

External links
Walt Disney World Resort – It's Tough to be a Bug!
It's Tough to Be a Bug Photo Gallery

Disney California Adventure
Walt Disney Parks and Resorts films
A Bug's Land
Disney's Animal Kingdom
Discovery Island (Disney's Animal Kingdom)
Pixar in amusement parks
Amusement rides introduced in 1998
Amusement rides introduced in 2001
Amusement rides that closed in 2018
Audio-Animatronic attractions
Films about insects
3D short films
4D films
Former Walt Disney Parks and Resorts attractions
1998 establishments in Florida
2001 establishments in California
2018 disestablishments in California
1998 computer-animated films
Films about ants